This partial list of city nicknames in Connecticut compiles the aliases, sobriquets and slogans that Connecticut cities and towns are known by (or have been known by historically), officially and unofficially, to municipal governments, local people, outsiders or their tourism boards or chambers of commerce. City nicknames can help in establishing a civic identity, helping outsiders recognize a community or attracting people to a community because of its nickname; promote civic pride; and build community unity. Nicknames and slogans that successfully create a new community "ideology or myth" are also believed to have economic value. Their economic value is difficult to measure, but there are anecdotal reports of cities that have achieved substantial economic benefits by "branding" themselves with new slogans.

Some unofficial nicknames are positive, while others are derisive. The unofficial nicknames listed here have been in use for a long time or have gained wide currency.
Ansonia - The Copper City
Berlin – Geographic Center of Connecticut
 Bethlehem – The Christmas Town
Bridgeport – The Park City
Bristol
 Clock City
 Mum City
Cheshire – Bedding Plant Capital of Connecticut.
Danbury – Hat City.Perrefort, Dirk. "Lawmakers honor Hat City, 4 veteran politicians", The News-Times, April 1, 2008. Accessed April 10, 2008. "Lawmakers tipped their hats to Danbury on Wednesday during the first Danbury Day at the Capitol. Legislators from throughout the state wore hats of every shape, size and color to honor the Hat City's history."
Derby – Connecticut's Smallest City
East Hampton – Belltown USA
Groton – Submarine Capital of the World
Hamden – Land of the Sleeping Giant
Hartford
Insurance Capital of the World
Homicide HartfordClaims to Fame – Business, Epodunk, accessed April 16, 2007.
Manchester – Silk City
Meriden – Silver City
Middletown – Forest City
Naugatuck – Rubber City
New Britain
Hardware City
Hard-hittin' New Britain
New Haven – The Elm City (reported in the 1880s as City of Elms)
Norwich – Rose City or The Rose of New England
Stamford
Lock City (a reference to the now-defunct Yale & Towne lock factory).
"The City that Works!"
Waterbury – The Brass CityWaterbury: The Brass City, Town Greens website, accessed February 19, 2008
West Haven – Connecticut's Friendliest City
Willimantic – Thread City
Winsted – Laurel City

See also
 Administrative divisions of Connecticut
 List of city nicknames in the United States
 List of municipalities of Connecticut by population

References

Connecticut cities and towns
Populated places in Connecticut
City nicknames